Will Bonsall is an American author, seed saver and veganic farmer who lives in Maine. He is a regular speaker about seed saving, organic farming and veganic farming.

Biography 
Bonsall was born in Waterville, Maine in 1949. He graduated from the University of Maine at Orono in 1971 and moved to San Francisco and hiked across the U.S. and Mexico. He later returned to Maine to build a homestead on 85 acres in Industry, Maine called Khadighar Farm. In 2010, he self-published a science fiction novel called Through the Eyes of a Stranger (Yaro Tales).

Bonsall was married to Molly Thorkildsen and has two grown sons. He is the founder of the Scatterseed Project and does write for organic gardening publications, does talks about gardening, and he does share vegan recipes.

Will Bonsall's Essential Guide 
In 2015, Chelsea Green published Will Bonsall’s Essential Guide to Radical, Self-reliant Gardening: Innovative Techniques for Growing Vegetables, Grains, and Perennial Food Crops with Minimal Fossil Fuel and Animal Inputs.

Seed saving 
In 1981, Bonsall founded the Scatterseed Project. In 1986, the Christian Science Monitor reported on Bonsall and his work saving seeds and saving heirloom crops. In the early 1990s Bonsall did help found Seed Savers Exchange in Iowa to preserve heirloom seeds and share seeds. Differences with Seed Savers Exchange later caused problems. Potato Grower reported: "The Seed Savers Exchange and Bonsall quit each other at roughly the same time, with the group no longer giving him what Torgrimson said was an annual stipend of between $13,000 and $15,000 to grow out his collection for them, and Bonsall no longer listing his vast collection of potatoes and seeds in the group’s annual yearbook. His mysterious absence from the pages of those books, and the possible cause of it, became a question bandied about on Seed Savers’ online forum throughout 2013."

In 2014, Bonsall founded the Grassroots Seed Network and the Portland Press Herald reported: "Nationally and even internationally, Bonsall is known as the curator of a collection of both rare and common potato varieties. The U.S. Department of Agriculture sends him potatoes it thinks might interest him. Someone in Norway might send him a few samples."

In 2016, Bonsall was featured in the documentary "SEED: The Untold Story."

In 2020, Down East Magazine wrote: "Bonsall’s dispersal efforts have been so prolific that he often finds himself chasing his own tail. He’ll receive what he’s told is a rare variety of such-and-such, but in trying to trace it back to its original source, he’ll find it came from someone who got it from someone who got it from an old hippie in western Maine." DownEast Magazine later did report the article about Bonsall was the #1 most-read story of 2020.

In 2020, WCAI radio reporter Elspeth Hay reported: "Around 2013, Bonsall says his collections collapsed. He couldn’t get the funding or the labor he needed to keep growing so many thousands of seeds. He still has a lot—his potato collection for instance is down to 200 varieties—but remember it used to be 700, and for him, it’s a huge loss. He says he can get many of the seeds he had back—since he’s sent so many to other growers around the world. But he’s seventy. He doesn’t want to build up his collection again just to lose it—he wants to make it sustainable, to find a way to train young farmers and pass The Scatterseed Project on."

Veganic farming 
Bonsall is a vegan and a proponent of veganic farming, which doesn't use animal products such as manure. In 2015, Chelsea Green published Will Bonsall’s Essential Guide to Radical, Self-reliant Gardening: Innovative Techniques for Growing Vegetables, Grains, and Perennial Food Crops with Minimal Fossil Fuel and Animal Inputs. He writes articles about crops for farming publications.

Bonsall was quoted by The Guardian newspaper in 2019 as saying that - "We vegans like to put on our plates [vegetables] grown in methods that are very un-vegan." He said manure, blood meal and other animal products that are being used for agriculture are what is causing the vegetables to be un-vegan. In 2018, the Portland Press Herald vegan columnist Avery Yale Kamila reported: "Bonsall credits his “obsession with self-reliance,” interest in sustainable living, appreciation for organic farming, and an allergy to ruminant meat with propelling him toward vegan eating and farming. About five years after starting the farm in 1971, he began to question the conventional wisdom around obtaining fertilizer from animals."

In 2019, The Guardian said of Bonsall's farming: "Bonsall’s is one of just 50 or so veganic farms in the United States, according to research by Professor Mona Seymour of Loyola Marymount University."

In 2019, Bonsall shared his recipe for succotash with PBS program Kitchen Vignettes. Host Aube Giroux said: "For his version of this traditional Native American dish, Will uses four main ingredients grown on his farm: corn, red pepper, zucchini, and the star of the show: shell beans."

He has been described as a "vegan homesteader."

In 2020, Bonsall was interviewed by radio host Caryn Hartglass and he said that veganic farming is better than organic farming or permaculture farming because those systems "involve growing a lot of things from seed to an animal and then eat the animal. To me, that basically nullifies the main advantage of permaculture; not killing and all that kind of stuff. When you put that stuff through an animal then you loose so much of the efficiency of it, like 90% throwing away. I just don’t get it. I think there is something more organic than organic and I think there’s something more permaculture than permaculture. Those are the things I’m trying to aim at and discuss in a lot of my books."

Vegetable claims 
In 2019, The Guardian reported that Bonsall said most vegetables are "very un-vegan.” Bonsall has said he is one of the "few vegans in the world who actually eats a 100 percent plant-based diet" because he grows his own food and "can vouch that it’s animal-free."

Personal life
In late 2021, Will briefly mentioned he was going through a divorce with his now-former wife, Molly Thorkildsen while teaching some students about composting. He also mentioned that he was 72 years old, although an exact date of birth is still unknown.

Awards 
In 2020, The Portland Press Herald awarded Bonsall the Source Seed Saver award. Portland Press Herald reporter Bob Keyes reported: "He has 1,100 varieties of peas and other legumes, including chickpeas, favas and runner beans. He has one of the largest Jerusalem artichoke seed collections in North America, and has more varieties of parsnip seeds than just about anybody anywhere."

Selected works 

 Will Bonsall’s Essential Guide to Radical, Self-reliant Gardening: Innovative Techniques for Growing Vegetables, Grains, and Perennial Food Crops with Minimal Fossil Fuel and Animal Inputs, 2015
 Through the Eyes of a Stranger (Yaro Tales), 2010

References

External links 

 Scaterseed Project
Fedco Seeds
Unique Maine Farms: Khadighar Farm
2015 video of Bonsall's keynote address at the Common Ground Country Fair 

Farmers from Maine
Living people
Organic farmers
People from Franklin County, Maine
People from Waterville, Maine
University of Maine alumni
American veganism activists
Vegan organic gardening
Writers from Maine
1949 births